Bagrat VI (1439 – 1478), a representative of the Imeretian branch of the Bagrationi dynasty, was a king of Imereti (as Bagrat II) from 1463, and a king of Georgia from 1465 until his death.

Life
He was the son of Prince George. Around 1455, he was granted the title of Eristavi (duke) of Samokalako (Kutaisi, western Imereti, and the surroundings) by the Georgian king George VIII. In the early 1460s, Bagrat supported the rebel prince Qvarqvare II Jaqeli, atabeg (prince) of Samtskhe, and the king deprived Bagrat of his duchy. In 1463, Bagrat led a coalition of western Georgian nobles who met and defeated George VIII at the Battle of Chikhori. Subsequently, Bagrat captured Kutaisi and was crowned king of Imereti. But in return for their aid, the new monarch was obliged to create a principality (samtavro) for each of his four allies. Henceforth the Gelovani clan in Svaneti, the Shervashidze (Sharvashidze) in Abkhazia, the Dadiani in Odishi (Mingrelia), and the Vardanidze in Guria ruled as semi-independent princes.

King of Georgia 
In 1465, after the king George VIII was defeated and imprisoned by Qvarqvare of Samtskhe, Bagrat used the opportunity and crossed the borders of East Georgia (Inner Kartli), where he proclaimed himself King of all Georgia. In fact, he possessed only west Georgia and Inner Kartli and remained mostly in western Georgia. In his western possessions, he also established a separate church, Catholicosate of Abkhazia, independent from the Patriarchate of Mtskheta (i.e., Georgian Orthodox Church). To justify this step, he asked Michael IV, Patriarch of Antioch and Jerusalem, to compose a "Law of Faith" which stated that western and eastern Georgia had different history of conversion and, therefore, they should be independent from each other.

Once freed from captivity, George VIII attempted to recover his throne, but was only able to establish himself in Kakheti, leaving the field in Kartli to his nephew, Constantine who seems to have consolidated his rule in the Lower Kartli in 1469. During this time of triarchy, Georgia was at least twice attacked by Uzun Hasan, the prince of the Ak Koyunlu clan (Münejjim Bashi speaks of three invasions, in 1466, in summer of 1472, and after Uzun Hassan's defeat by the Ottoman Turks in 1476-7). Bagrat had to make peace with the invaders, abandoning Tbilisi to the enemy. It was only after Uzun Hasan's death (1478) when the Georgians were able to recover their capital.

In 1477, Eristav of Odishi, Vameq II Dadiani opposed Bagrat's rule in Western Georgia, he then assembled the Abkhazians and Gurians and began the raids in Imereti. The reaction of the king of Georgia was immediate. Bagrat VI defeated and subdued Vameq II Dadiani.

Bagrat died in 1478, and was succeeded by his son, Alexander II.

Bagrat VI was buried at the Gelati Monastery near Kutaisi.

Family and children
He was married to Elene (died November 3, 1510), who bore him three sons:
Vakhtang (died very young)
Alexander II
David

In historical fiction

 Emanuele Rizzardi, L'ultimo Paleologo. PubMe Editor, 2018

Notes

References
Ivane Javakhishvili, The History of the Georgian Nation, vol. 3 (1982), Tbilisi State University Press, pages 320–340 (In Georgian)
Ronald Grigor Suny, The Making of the Georgian Nation: 2nd edition (December 1994), Indiana University Press, pages 45–46

Kings of Georgia
Kings of Imereti
Eastern Orthodox monarchs
Bagrationi dynasty of the Kingdom of Georgia
1430s births
1478 deaths